Sorhoanus is a genus of true bugs belonging to the family Cicadellidae.

The species of this genus are found in Eurasia and Northern America.

Species:
 Sorhoanus arsenjevi Anufriev, 1978 
 Sorhoanus assimilis Fallén, 1806

References

Cicadellidae
Hemiptera genera